First Mind is the debut album by British singer-songwriter Nick Mulvey, and was released on 12 May 2014.

Promotion

In June 2013 Mulvey embarked on a 16-date tour, supporting Laura Marling on eight dates of her UK tour, and playing festivals including Glastonbury and Latitude.
In December of that year Mulvey was nominated for the BBC Sound of 2014 award, eventually losing to fellow countryman Sam Smith. On 10 September 2014 First Mind was shortlisted for the 2014 Mercury Prize, alongside artists such as Damon Albarn, Bombay Bicycle Club and Kae Tempest.

Critical reception

According to review aggregator website Metacritic, First Mind received an average score of 77 out of 100 based on 9 reviews, indicating generally favorable reviews.

The Telegraph awarded the album five stars, with reviewer Helen Brown calling the album "a lovely, and rewarding record." Clash were similarly positive, complimenting the album for being "full of intricacies and influences that should see it celebrated as one of the great albums of 2014." Q commended Mulvey on his debut work outside of Portico Quartet, confirming that he "is very much his own man on this highly intriguing debut." Popular blog The Line of Best Fit complimented the album on being "a total package of pop hooks, instrumental genius and gorgeous rhythms", calling Mulvey "an extremely talented musician".

Track listing

Personnel
Alexis Smith - Engineering, Mixing
Dan Carey - Ukulele, Bass Guitar, Drum Machine, Electric Guitar, Prophet Synthesizer, Swarmatron Synthesizer, Mixing, Music Box 
Isadora Tanner - Backing Vocals
Izzi Dunn - Cello
John Dent - Mastering
Liam Hutton - Drums
Mike Pagulatos - Viola
Nick Mulvey - Vocals, Guitar, Harmonium, Prophet Synthesizer, Percussion, Ukulele, Mellotron
Shahzad Ismaily - Percussion, Synthesizer

Chart performance

References

2014 albums
Nick Mulvey albums
Fiction Records albums
Albums produced by Dan Carey (record producer)